Lu Dingyi (June 9, 1906 – May 9, 1996) was a leader of the Chinese Communist Party. After the establishment of the People's Republic of China and before the Cultural Revolution, he was credited as one of the top officials in socialist culture.

Biography
Lu Dingyi joined the Chinese Communist Party in 1925, while he was studying electrical engineering at the Nanyang Public School. After graduation, he fully joined revolutionary activities, being mainly involved in the Communist Youth League, writing articles for its newspaper Chinese Youth (later renamed Proletarian Youth and then Leninist Youth). In 1927 he took part at both the 5th CCP National Congress and the CYL Congress, being elected a member of the CYL Central Committee working with its Propaganda Department. He was actively involved in countering Chiang Kai-shek's anti-communist coup, organizing communist unities in Guangdong. In 1928 Lu Dingyi took part at the 6th CCP National Congress and the CYL Congress, both of which were held in Moscow, remaining in the Soviet Union until 1930 as a junior representative of the CYL to the Comintern.

Lu Dingyi then returned in China and participated in the Long March as an editor of the Red Star newspaper. He also worked with the Propaganda Department of the Eighth Route Army, and was a member of the CCP Propaganda Department starting from 1934. In 1942 he was promoted to chief editor of the Liberation Daily after his predecessor Yang Song fell ill.

During the "Yan'an Rectification Movement", Lu Dingyi wrote Our basic view for journalism, which was considered the basis for Chinese communist journalism. In 1943 he was appointed head of the CCP Central Propaganda Department, a post he held until 1952 and then again from 1954. He was elected CCP Central Committee member in 1945.

A political commissar in the PLA, Lu Dingyi gave important contributions to the revolutionary struggle in Shaanxi along with other top leaders like Mao Zedong, Zhou Enlai and Ren Bishi, according to his official biography.

After the establishment of the People's Republic of China, Lu Dingyi was deputy chairman of the Culture and Education Committee of the Central People's Government from 1949 and member of the Standing Committee of the National People's Congress from 1954. At the 8th Party Congress in 1956, he was re-elected a CCP Central Committee member and promoted to Politburo alternate member, concurrently serving as secretary of the CCP Secretariat from 1962. In 1957 and 1960, he accompanied major Party leaders Mao Zedong, Liu Shaoqi and Deng Xiaoping to international meetings of communist parties held in Moscow. His main political activity was in the cultural front, as he directed cultural criticism campaigns.

In 1959 he was appointed a Vice Premier of the State Council, and Minister of Culture in 1965. Shortly after, the Cultural Revolution broke out and Lu Dingyi was accused of being a promoter of the reactionary line in culture, since he did not adhere to Mao Zedong's idea that culture should extensively serve proletarian politics. In May 1966 he was accused of being part of the "Peng-Luo-Lu-Yang anti-Party clique" (the others being Peng Dehuai, Luo Ruiqing and Yang Shangkun) and dismissed. He was also criticised for his activity in the Five Man Group, a Central Committee agency in charge of leading the first stages of the Cultural Revolution led by Peng Zhen, another purged official. He was detained for nearly 13 years.

Lu Dingyi was rehabilitated by the new leadership headed by Deng Xiaoping. In 1979 he was co-opted in the Fifth CPPCC National Committee as its vice-chairman; in the same year, he was co-opted in the CCP Central Committee as a consultant to the Propaganda Department. He was later a member of the Central Advisory Commission.

Lu Dingyi died in Beijing in 1996, several years after his retirement. He was hailed as an outstanding Party member and promoter of socialist culture. His knowledge of the English language also allowed him to translate the conversations between Mao Zedong and Anna Louise Strong.

References

 Lu Dingyi's official biography

|-

|-

|-

1906 births
1996 deaths
Chinese Communist Party politicians from Jiangsu
Ministers of Culture of the People's Republic of China
Victims of the Cultural Revolution
Politicians from Wuxi
People's Republic of China politicians from Jiangsu
Heads of the Publicity Department of the Chinese Communist Party
Members of the Secretariat of the Chinese Communist Party
Vice Chairpersons of the National Committee of the Chinese People's Political Consultative Conference